Invocation: Jazz Meets the Symphony No. 7  is an album by Argentine-American composer, pianist, and conductor Lalo Schifrin with a jazz quartet and the Czech National Symphony Orchestra recorded in Prague, Czech Republic in 2010 and released on the Aleph label in 2011.  The album was the seventh in Schifrin's highly acclaimed "Jazz Meets the Symphony" series.  Unlike some others in the series, the album was not recorded before a live audience.

Playlist
Source = 

	Trombone Fantasy  (Lalo Schifrin)	8:59
	Groovin’ High (Dizzy Gillespie, arranged by Schifrin)  	9:26
	Invocations  (Lalo Schifrin)	9:13
	Summer Dance  (Lalo Schifrin)	6:28
	Reverie (Claude Debussy, arranged by Schifrin)	5:28
	Etude In Rhythm  (Lalo Schifrin)	15:57
	Here ‘Tis (Dizzy Gillespie, arranged by Schifrin)	11:48

Personnel
Performers:-

Czech National Symphony Orchestra
Lalo Schifrin – piano, arranger, composer, conductor, album producer
Kryštof Marek – conductor
James Morrison – trumpet, fluegelhorn, piccolo trumpet, and trombone 
Pierre Boussaguet – bass
Tom Gordon – drums.

Production:-
Donna Schifrin – executive producer
Jan Kotzmann – recording engineer
Cenda Kotzmann, Standa Baroch, Sylva Smejkalova – assistant engineers
Gustavo Borner – digital editing, mixing & mastering engineer
Theresa Eastman Schifrin – art direction, album design
Barbara Chase & Martin Maly – photography
Richard Palmer – liner notes

References

Lalo Schifrin albums
2011 albums
Albums arranged by Lalo Schifrin
Albums conducted by Lalo Schifrin